DeRonn Scott Jr. (born April 26, 1991) is an American former professional basketball player.

College career
Scott played college basketball for Xavier University of Louisiana and Cal Poly Pomona.

Professional career
After graduating from Cal Poly Pomona in 2014, Scott joined the Providence Sky Chiefs of the American Basketball Association. He helped the Sky Chiefs reach a 9–4 record and averaged 13.1 points per game. On January 24, 2015, he signed with the Nelson Giants in New Zealand for the 2015 NBL season. In 19 games for Nelson, he averaged 16.1 points, 3.3 rebounds and 3.2 assists per game.

On August 20, 2015, Scott signed with ZZ Leiden of the Dutch Basketball League. On December 1, 2015, he was released by Leiden after appearing in eight league games and five Europe Cup games.

In December 2016, Scott signed with the Cape Breton Highlanders of the National Basketball League of Canada. In 30 games for the Highlanders, he averaged 9.0 points, 4.2 rebounds and 2.8 assists per game.

References

External links
Cal Poly Pomona Broncos bio
Meet De Ronn Scott - Providence Sky Chiefs Player Profiles
Import Introduction: DeRonn Scott
Scorers 1st player profile

1991 births
Living people
American expatriate basketball people in Canada
American expatriate basketball people in New Zealand
American expatriate basketball people in the Netherlands
American men's basketball players
Basketball players from California
B.S. Leiden players
Cal Poly Pomona Broncos men's basketball players
Dutch Basketball League players
Nelson Giants players
Point guards
Shooting guards
Xavier Gold Rush basketball players